The Iziko South African National Gallery is the national art gallery of South Africa located in Cape Town. It became part of the Iziko collection of museums – as managed by the Department of Arts and Culture – in 2001. It then became an agency of the Department of Arts and Culture. Its collection consists largely of Dutch, French and British works from the 17th to the 19th century. This includes lithographs, etchings and some early 20th-century British paintings. Contemporary art work displayed in the gallery is selected from many of South Africa's communities and the gallery houses an authoritative collection of sculpture and beadwork.

History

At a meeting in the Cape Town Public Library, convened on 12 October 1850, proposals were discussed to erect a building in the Company's Garden for the purpose of exhibiting art. This occasion was the inaugural meeting of the South African Fine Arts Association, founded by Thomas Butterworth Bayley and Abraham de Schmidt.  The Association went on to arrange the first ever exhibition of fine art in South Africa. This took place on 10 May 1851 in the school rooms in the Company's Garden in Cape Town. Its primary raison d'être remained the establishing of a permanent home for a National collection.

The National collection was founded in 1872 with a bequest of paintings from the estate of Thomas Butterworth Bayley. In 1875, the Association was able to purchase premises in the current Queen Victoria Street where the nucleus of the Art Gallery was exhibited. By the South African Art Gallery Act of 1895 the South African Government took over the collection in trust and purchased the premises from the Association for R12 000. A board of five trustees were elected in 1896 to manage the collection.

The National Gallery Act made provision for the building of new premises, but foundations were only laid in 1914. The collection was kept in a wing of the South African Museum from 1900 and the current building only officially opened to the public on 3 November 1930, by the Earl of Athlone.

Notable contributions by Dr Alfred de Pass, Sir Abe Bailey, Sir Edmund and Lady Davis and Lady Michaelis expanded the scope of the collection over the years. In 1937, the building was expanded to accommodate purchases that included South African artists. The first pieces by South African artists, by Anton van Wouw (African Head) and Neville Lewis (Adderley Street Flower-sellers), had been purchased in 1926.

Selected collection highlights

List of directors of the Iziko South African National Gallery

Notable artworks 
 Adderley Street Flower-sellers
 African Head
 Holiday Time in Cape Town in the Twentieth Century, in Honour of the Expected Arrival of a Governor-General of UNITED South Africa
 The Butcher Boys

Permanent collection artists (non-exhaustive)

 Jane Alexander (The Butcher Boys)
 Willem Boshoff
 Alan Davie
 Marlene Dumas
 Robert Hodgins
 William Kentridge – The gallery contains Kentridge's series of five Soho Eckstein short animated films (1989–1996).
 Ronald Kitaj
 Moses Kottler
 Maggie Laubser
 Lippy Lipshitz
Kagiso Patrick Mautloa
 Michael Porter
 Gerard Sekoto
 Penny Siopis
 Kathryn Smith
 Irma Stern
 Diane Victor

See also
 List of national galleries

References

External links
 The Abe Bailey collection
Iziko South African National Gallery within Google Arts & Culture

Art museums and galleries in South Africa
Museums in Cape Town
Art museums established in 1930
1930 establishments in South Africa
South Africa